E. tenuicornis may refer to:
 Elenchus tenuicornis, a strepsipteran insect species, parasitizing delphacid planthoppers.
 Eonecrophorus tenuicornis, a carrion beetle species found in eastern Nepal